Maple Ridge Wind Farm is the largest wind farm in the state of New York in the United States. Located on Tug Hill in Lewis County, the facility has 195 wind turbines. At full operation, the turbines can produce a maximum of 321.75 megawatts (MW) of electricity.

Description
Maple Ridge Wind Farm, which achieved full operation in 2006, is a facility with 195 Vestas model V82 1.65 MW wind turbines. The Danish model machines were shipped in parts by sea to the United States, and via the St. Lawrence Seaway to Lake Ontario, where they were unloaded at the Oswego Port Authority. They were transported by numerous trucks to the area of the farm near Lowville, New York.

Collectively, the turbines can produce a maximum of nearly 322 MW. 

Maple Ridge Wind Farm became fully operational in June 2006.

The wind farm is located on Tug Hill in Lewis County, New York.

Maple Ridge Wind Farm was named in honor of Lewis County's maple syrup production, for which it ranks as the top county in New York. NPR reported mixed reactions among the neighbors to the wind farm operations.

Electricity production

See also

New York energy law
Wind power in New York
Wind power in the United States

References

External links
 Building the Maple Ridge Wind Farm, Photographs of the turbines being off loaded at the Oswego Port Authority & shipped to Lowville.
 Wind Farm in My Backyard: ScienCentral Report
 A video showing wiring the turbines by International Brotherhood of Electrical Workers members
Tapping Maple Ridge, documentary film about Maple Ridge Wind Farm
Maple Ridge Wind Farm Fact Sheet

Energy infrastructure completed in 2006
Wind farms in New York (state)
Buildings and structures in Lewis County, New York